Mélanie is the sixth French-language studio album by Canadian singer Celine Dion, released in Quebec, Canada on 22 August 1984. It includes the hit song, "Une colombe". The album reached number one in Quebec, was certified Gold in Canada and won two Félix Awards for Album of the Year and Best Selling Album of the Year.

Content
The album includes ten songs co-written mainly by Eddy Marnay and produced by Marnay and René Angélil. "Une colombe" was performed by Dion for Pope John Paul II in front of 65,000 people at the Olympic Stadium in Montreal in 1984. The title track was dedicated to Dion's little niece Karine, diagnosed with cystic fibrosis.

In 2016, "Trois heures vingt" was played as the opening processional during the funeral services of her husband and manager, René Angélil. It was also included on Dion's 2016 album, Encore un soir.

Commercial performance
The album became another commercial success, reaching Gold in Canada. It topped the chart in Quebec for ten weeks. "Une colombe" was also certified Gold. Mélanie produced two top ten Quebec singles in "Une colombe" and "Mon rêve de toujours", which peaked at number two and four, respectively. The third single, "Un amour pour moi" was also considerably successful and peaked at number twelve.

Accolades

The next year, Dion won five Felix Awards, including Album of the Year and Best Selling Album of the Year for Mélanie, Female Vocalist of the Year, Song of the Year ("Une colombe") and Best Selling Single of the Year ("Une colombe"). She was also nominated for the Felix Award for Pop Album of the Year (Mélanie), Artist of the Year Achieving the Most Success Outside Quebec and Show of the Year (Céline Dion en concert). Additionally, Harvey Robitaille won Felix Award for Sound Engineer of the Year thanks to Céline Dion en concert and Paul Baillargeon was nominated for Arranger of the Year thanks to "Une colombe".

Track listing

Charts

Certifications and sales

Release history

References

External links
 

1984 albums
Albums produced by Eddy Marnay
Celine Dion albums
Albums produced by René Angélil